Miracle Workers is an American anthology comedy television series created by Simon Rich for TBS. It is based in part on Rich's writings, with the first season being based on his 2012 novel What in God's Name, while the short story "Revolution" provided the basis for the second season. The series stars an ensemble cast comprising Daniel Radcliffe, Steve Buscemi, Geraldine Viswanathan, Jon Bass, Karan Soni, Sasha Compère, and Lolly Adefope.

Miracle Workers premiered on February 12, 2019, with its seven-episode first season. A ten-episode second season, subtitled Dark Ages, premiered in January 2020. The third season, subtitled Oregon Trail, premiered on July 13, 2021. In November 2021, the series was renewed for a fourth season, subtitled End Times, which will premiere in 2023.

Premise

Season 1
The first season follows Craig, a low-level angel responsible for handling all of humanity's prayers, and Eliza, a recent transfer from the Department of Dirt. Their boss, God, has pretty much checked out to focus on his favorite hobbies. To prevent Earth's destruction, Craig and Eliza must achieve their most impossible miracle to date. The season is based on Rich's novel What in God's Name.

Season 2
The second season is set during the Dark Ages, and is based on Rich's short story "Revolution".

Season 3
Reverend Ezekiel Brown leads his dying, famine-stricken town for a better life on the Oregon Trail, taking in notorious outlaw Benny the Teen as trailmaster.

Season 4
Season four will take place in a post-nuclear apocalyptic setting.

Cast and characters

Main
 Daniel Radcliffe as:
 Craig Bog (season 1)
 Prince Chauncley the Pretty Cool (season 2)
 Reverend Ezekiel Brown (season 3)
 Sid (season 4)
 Steve Buscemi as:
 God (season 1)
 Edward "Eddie" Murphy Shitshoveler (season 2)
 Benny the Teen (season 3)
 Boomtown Merchant (season 4)
 Geraldine Viswanathan as:
 Eliza Hunter (season 1)
 Alexandra "Al" Shitshoveler (season 2)
 Prudence Aberdeen (season 3)
 Freya (season 4)
 Karan Soni as:
 Sanjay Prince (season 1)
 Lord Chris Vexler (season 2)
 The Gunslinger (season 3)
 The Cyborg (season 4)
 Jon Bass as:
 Sam (season 1)
 Michael "Mikey" Shitshoveler (season 2)
 Todd Aberdeen (season 3)
 Scraps the Dog (season 4)
 Sasha Compère as Laura (season 1)
 Lolly Adefope as:
 Rosie (season 1)
 Maggie (season 2)

Guest

Season 1
 John Reynolds as Mason
 Angela Kinsey as Gail, an angel in the Department of Angel Resources
 Tim Meadows as Dave Shelby
 Chris Parnell as God's Dad
 Margaret Cho as God's Mom
 Tituss Burgess as God's Brother
 Ruby Matenko as God's Sister

Season 2
 Peter Serafinowicz as King Cragnoor the Heartless
 Tony Cavalero as Ted Carpenter
 Jessica Lowe as Mary Baker
 Jamie Demetriou as Town crier
 Kevin Dunn as Bert Shitshoveler
 Fred Armisen as Percival Forthwind
 Kerri Kenney-Silver as Lila
 Dee Ahluwalia as Lucas
 Jack Mosedale as Wesley Pervert
 Sinead Phelps as Trish
 Greta Lee as Princess Vicki

Season 3
 Lamont Thompson as Farmer John
 Tammy Dahlstrom as Martha
 River Drosche as Young Levi
 Shay Mitchell as Purple
 Jordan Firstman as Kaya
 Mary Anne McGarry as Granny McGill
 Quinta Brunson as Trig
 Carl Tart as Lionel
 Tim Meadows as Jedidiah Noonan
 Erin Darke as Phaedra
 Jessica Lowe as Branchwater tavern host
 Ron Funches as Dirty Dick Bob
 Karamo Brown as American Patriot
 Marisa Quintanilla as Sheila
 Bobby Moynihan as Governor Lane
 Paul F. Tompkins as Snake Oil Salesman

Season 4

Episodes

Season 1 (2019)

Season 2: Dark Ages (2020)

Season 3: Oregon Trail (2021)

Season 4: End Times

Production

Development
On May 17, 2017, TBS announced that it had given the production a series order for a first season consisting of seven episodes. The series was created by Simon Rich and based on his novel What in God's Name. Executive producers were expected to include Rich, Lorne Michaels, Andrew Singer, Daniel Radcliffe, and Owen Wilson. Production companies involved with the series were slated to consist of Broadway Video and Studio T. On October 19, 2017, it was announced that Wilson would no longer be serving as an executive producer and would be replaced with Steve Buscemi.

On May 15, 2019, the series was renewed for a second season. On November 20, 2019, it was announced that the second season, titled Miracle Workers: Dark Ages, would premiere on January 28, 2020. On August 6, 2020, the series was renewed for a third season that will focus on the Wild West and Oregon Trail. On May 19, 2021, it was announced that the third season, titled Miracle Workers: Oregon Trail, would premiere on July 13, 2021. On November 3, 2021, TBS renewed the series for a fourth season. On October 27, 2022, it was announced that the fourth season, titled End Times, would premiere on January 16, 2023. In early January, TBS quietly postponed the season premiere to a date yet to be announced later in 2023.

Casting
Alongside the initial series order announcement, it was confirmed that Daniel Radcliffe and Owen Wilson would star in the series. On October 19, 2017, it was announced Steve Buscemi had replaced Wilson in the role of God after the latter had decided to vacate the part. In November 2017, Deadline Hollywood and Variety reported that Geraldine Viswanathan, Jon Bass, Karan Soni, and Sasha Compère had been cast in series regular roles. On March 25, 2018, it was announced that Lolly Adefope had joined the cast in a main role. On May 27, 2021, Quinta Brunson joined in recurring role for the third season.

Filming
Principal photography for the first season took place in December 2017 and January 2018 in and around Atlanta, Georgia. Filming took place in Norcross, Georgia, on December 29, 2017, and in Piedmont Park on January 16, 2018.

Release

On December 4, 2018, TBS announced that the series would premiere on February 12, 2019. On February 8, 2019, TBS released the first episode of the series on its official YouTube channel. In Australia, the series has same day release on the streaming service Stan as a Stan Exclusive.

Marketing
On December 5, 2018, TBS released a teaser trailer for the series. On December 19, 2018, the official full length trailer was released.

Premiere
On January 26, 2019, the series held a screening of the pilot episode during the 2019 Sundance Film Festival. Those in attendance included Daniel Radcliffe, Geraldine Viswanathan, Karan Soni, and Simon Rich.

Delay of season 4
The first episode of End Times was released on HBO Max in some countries on January 16, 2023. However, the episode did not air on TBS in the U.S. that week as previously scheduled, and was removed from HBO Max two days later, with the remainder of the season delayed indefinitely. According to a spokesperson for TBS, Miracle Workers was “one of the impacted series” in a January scheduling adjustment. The network said the scheduling shift would allow TBS to “better support the series later in the year.”

Reception

Critical response
On Rotten Tomatoes, the first season has an approval rating of 74% based on reviews from 39 critics, with an average rating of 6.26/10. The website's critical consensus reads, "More charming than clever, Miracle Workers functions as a palatable showcase of Daniel Radcliffe and Steve Buscemi's quirky star power." On Metacritic it has a score of 61 out of 100 based on reviews from 19 critics. On Rotten Tomatoes, the second season has an approval rating of 78% based on reviews from 9 critics, with an average rating of 5.60/10.

Ratings

Season 1 (2019)

Season 2 (2020)

Season 3 (2021)

Accolade 
Radcliffe was nominated for Choice Comedy TV Actor for his work on the series at the 2019 Teen Choice Awards.

See also
 List of films about angels

Notes

References

External links
  on TBS
 

2010s American workplace comedy television series
2020s American workplace comedy television series
2019 American television series debuts
2010s American anthology television series
2020s American anthology television series
Adaptations of works by Simon Rich
Angels in television
English-language television shows
Fiction about God
Religious comedy television series
TBS (American TV channel) original programming
Television shows based on American novels
Television series set in the Middle Ages
Television series by Broadway Video
Television series by Studio T
Television series created by Simon Rich
Works by Jeff Loveness